Mikkel Dobloug may refer to:
Mikkel Dobloug (politician) (1844–1913), Norwegian wholesaler and politician
Mikkel Dobloug (skier) (born 1944), Norwegian Nordic combined skier